Lledwigan is a village in the  community of Llangristiolus, Ynys Môn, Wales, which is 130.8 miles (210.6 km) from Cardiff and 213.4 miles (343.4 km) from London.

References

See also
List of localities in Wales by population

Villages in Anglesey